700 Auravictrix is an asteroid belonging to the Flora family in the Main Belt. Its diameter is about 15 km and it has an albedo of 0.246. Its rotation period is 6.075 hours.

References

External links 
 
 

Flora asteroids
1910 in science
19100605
Auravictrix
Auravictrix